Wings of Evolution is a 2007 documentary film about the revolutionary educational system of the Siragu Montessori School, a school for homeless and underprivileged children, located in the outskirts of Chennai in Tamil Nadu, India. For a long time, the focus of education in India has been one of compulsory learning procedures, rote learning and examination-based evaluation with no emphasis on children's understanding of concepts, critical thinking and implications in their life outside school.

Siragu Montessori School, in spite of limited resources and great obstacles has maintained a quality program, free for those who attend.

The Documentary film focuses on bringing together children from around the world, through a worldwide postcard sharing workshop in which the children share thoughts, exchange ideas and promote cultural diversity, global peace and understanding towards building a better tomorrow.

Fund raising for the Wings Of Evolution - Siragu Montessori School is undertaken by Positive People Today which is a 501 (c3) non-profit organization, which aims to unite human beings all over the Earth on the simple principle of
"Positive Thinking".

External links 

Accessible Horizon Films - Wings of Evolution Documentary
Siragu Montessori School

Wings of Evolution - Window2india
Wings of Evolution Blog
Appeal from Siragu
The Hindu
India Vision 2020

Film festivals
Official Selection at South Asian International Film Festival (SAIFF)

American independent films
Documentary films about education
2007 films
2007 documentary films
Schools in Chennai
Montessori schools in India
2007 independent films
2000s American films